Iniopterygiformes ("Nape Wing Forms") is an extinct order of chimaera-like cartilaginous fish that lived from the Devonian to Carboniferous periods (345–280 million years ago). Fossils of them have been found in Montana, Indiana, Illinois, and Nebraska. The Iniopterygians are characterized by large pectoral fins, wing-like projections on their backs, mounted high on the body and denticulated bony plates on the head and jaws. The elongated pectoral fins had denticles along the leading edge which may have had a role in mating. They are thought to have been able to move their pectorals in a vertical plane, ”flying” through the water much like modern-day flying fish.

The majority of iniopterygians are placed within the family Sibyrhinchidae. Members of this family include Sibyrhinchus denisoni, Inioptera richardsoni, and Inioxyele. Ironically, Iniopteryx rushlaui, the type species, has not yet been assigned to a specific family, though some experts place it in its own monotypic family, "Iniopterygidae."  The closest modern-day relatives of the Iniopterygii are the Chimaeras (Chimaeriformes) also known as ghost sharks, rabbit fish or rat fish.

These fish had several unusual features: massive skulls with huge eye sockets, shark-like teeth in rows, tails with clubs, enormous pectoral fins that were dorsalized or placed almost on their backs, and bone-like spikes or hooks on the tips of their fins.

Bibliography 
 Richard Lund and Eileen D. Grogan: Relationships of the Chimaeriformes and the Basal Radiation of the Chondrichthyes, Reviews in Fish Biology and Fisheries 7: 65-123. 1997
 Rainer Zangerl: Handbook of Paleoichthyology 3 A. Chondrichthyes I. Paleozoic Elasmobranchii. Gustav Fischer Verlag, New York 1981 (unveränderte Neuauflage Januar 2004) 
 Rainer Zangerl and Gerard Ramon Case: Iniopterygia: a new order of Chondrichthyan fishes from the Pennsylvanian of North America. Fieldiana Geology Memoirs, v. 6, Field Museum of Natural History, 1973 Biodiversity Heritage Library (Volltext, engl.)
 Joseph S. Nelson: Fishes of the World. John Wiley & Sons, 2006,

External links
 AMNH article
 Scientists snare 3-D image of oldest fossil brain

 
Devonian cartilaginous fish
Carboniferous cartilaginous fish
Prehistoric cartilaginous fish orders
Late Devonian taxonomic orders
Mississippian taxonomic orders
Holocephali
Devonian first appearances
Carboniferous extinctions